Cute is a ghost town in Meigs County, Tennessee, United States.

A post office located inside a store in Cute operated from 1881 to 1907.

References

Former populated places in Tennessee